Hofmeyriidae is a family of therocephalian therapsids. It includes the genus  Ictidostoma.

References

External links
 Hofmeyriidae in the Paleobiology Database

Eutherocephalians
Permian first appearances
Permian extinctions
Prehistoric therapsid families